Imbi the girl (styled as imbi the girl) is an Australian singer-songwriter, rapper and poet who was born and raised in Sydney.

Career
In June 2017, imbi the girl's debut single "acidic" was released which was soon followed by the release of "V.I.P." in September.

imbi the girl is listed as a feature artist on Esoterik's 2018 single "Wide Awake", part of his EP My Astral Plane which was nominated for the 2018 ARIA Award for Best Urban Release.

In April 2018, imbi the girl was announced as a winner of the Triple J Unearthed and NIDA competition that saw students direct and produce a music video which was premiered on the television show rage later in the year.

imbi the girl's debut EP, for me, was released in September 2018, shortly after the release of their third single "swell". They describe the EP as "a small taste of the goodness that is yet to come."

In May 2019, imbi the girl travelled to London after being chosen by APRA AMCOS to take part in SongHubs, which aims to connect local and international songwriters.

In October 2019, imbi the girl was nominated for Live Voice of the Year (NSW) at the National Live Music Awards.

Touring
imbi the girl has performed at festivals such as Groovin The Moo, BIGSOUND, Laneway, Party in the Paddock and Festival of the Sun.

In September 2018, they toured nationally with Listen Out (festival) which saw performances in Melbourne, Perth, Sydney and Brisbane.

imbi the girl has supported artists such as FKJ, Sampa the Great, Horrorshow, as well as Odette on her national tour throughout March and April in 2019.

In April 2019, imbi the girl announced their first headline tour, visiting venues in Sydney, Melbourne and Brisbane in June.

Influences
In an interview with Oyster, imbi the girl said they "grew up listening to Amy Winehouse and Macy Gray with my mum, and Wyclef Jean and The Fugees with my dad". As Imbar got older, they "started listening to Chance the Rapper, Childish Gambino, Noname and Lizzo". imbi the girl credits Allen Ginsberg and Sarah Kay as notable poetic influences. They told Gay Times Magazine that they've "always looked up to Missy Elliot and her ability to be who she was unapologetically and express herself truthfully through not only her music but her fashion and her whole demeanour".

Personal life 
imbi the girl is queer and non-binary. They use they/them and he/him pronouns.

Discography

Extended plays

Singles

As lead artist

As featured artist

References

Singers from Sydney
1997 births
Living people
Queer singers
Queer songwriters
Australian LGBT singers
Australian LGBT songwriters
LGBT rappers
Non-binary singers
Non-binary songwriters
Alternative hip hop musicians
21st-century Australian singers
Rappers from Sydney